Brizeaux is a commune in the Argonne region and Meuse department in the Grand Est region in northeastern France.

Brizeaux is the only village in the commune. The nearest town is Sainte-Menehould, 20 km to the northwest. Paris is 214 km away.

Population

See also
Communes of the Meuse department

References

Communes of Meuse (department)